4-Wheel Vibe is the second album by American punk rock band Bracket, released by Caroline Records on May 16, 1995.  Produced by  Don Fleming, 4-Wheel Vibe expanded on the pop punk sound of their debut 924 Forestville St. and began to showcase a wider range of songwriting.  In addition to music videos for "Trailer Park" and "Circus Act", leftover songs from the album's sessions were released the following year on the 4 Rare Vibes EP.  Bracket released alternate versions of several tracks from 4-Wheel Vibe on Rare Cuts in 2013.

Track listing
All songs written and composed by Bracket.
"Circus Act" – 3:43
"Cool Aide" – 3:32
"Happy to Be Sad" – 1:53
"John Wilke's Isolation Booth" – 2:46
"Tractor" – 2:47
"Green Apples" – 2:02
"Closed Captioned" – 3:47
"Trailer Park" – 3:07
"Fresh Air" – 2:29
"P.C." – 2:50
"G-Vibe" – 2:07
"Warren's Song, Pt. 4" – 2:51
"2 Hot Dogs for 99¢" – 1:50
"Metal" – 1:27
"Pessimist" – 2:11
"Lazy" – 5:31 (includes "My Stepson" as a hidden track)

Personnel
 Marty Gregori – lead vocals, guitars
 Larry Tinney – guitars
 Zack Charlos – bass guitar, backing vocals
 Ray Castro – drums
 Don Fleming – producer, lead guitar on "John Wilke's Isolation Booth"
 Joe Marquez – engineer, piano on "Lazy"
 Troy Hahn – photography
 Bracket – design concept
 Tom Bejgowicz – art direction, layout
 Catharine Clune – violin on "Lazy"
 Matt Brubeck – cello on "Lazy"

References

1995 albums
Bracket (band) albums
Caroline Records albums